The spotted free-tailed bat (Chaerephon bivittatus) is a species of bat in the family Molossidae. It is found in Burundi, Djibouti, Eritrea, Ethiopia, Kenya, Mozambique, Rwanda, South Sudan, Tanzania, Uganda, Zambia, and Zimbabwe. Its natural habitats are dry savanna, moist savanna, and rocky areas.

References

Chaerephon (bat)
Mammals described in 1861
Taxonomy articles created by Polbot
Taxa named by Theodor von Heuglin
Bats of Africa